Jane Moore Sibbett (born November 28, 1962) is an American actress. Her most notable roles include Heddy Newman on the Fox television series Herman's Head and Carol Willick on the television series Friends.

Early life
Sibbett was born in Berkeley, California, the youngest of five children. She was raised on Alameda Island, in the San Francisco Bay. She is a graduate of the University of California, Los Angeles, where she became a member of the California Delta chapter of Pi Beta Phi, an international women's fraternity.

Career
Sibbett started her acting career as Jane Wilson on the NBC soap opera Santa Barbara  in 1986–87, for which she was nominated for a Best Newcomer Soap Opera Digest Awards. In 1989, she won the role of Laurie Parr on the CBS comedy The Famous Teddy Z, co-starring with Jon Cryer and Alex Rocco. The series lasted one season. In 1991, Sibbett was cast as status-conscious bombshell Heddy Newman on the Fox sitcom Herman's Head, which quickly gained a cult following on the young broadcast network and lasted three seasons. Beginning in 1994, she played the occasional role of Carol Willick on Friends, a part-time stint that lasted until the end of the show's seventh season in 2001. During her Friends association, Sibbett had regular roles on the short-lived CBS sitcom If Not for You (1995), playing the jilted fiancée of her former Herman's Head co-star Hank Azaria, and in the second season of The WB's Nick Freno: Licensed Teacher (1997–98), playing school headmaster Dr. Katherine Emerson. 
 
Sibbett has appeared in more than 200 episodes of multiple TV series, including 21 Jump Street and The Nanny. She starred in the 1998 movie Noah alongside Tony Danza and Wallace Shawn as well as in 1998's The Second Arrival, alongside Patrick Muldoon and Michael Sarrazin. She appeared in Dan O'Bannon's 1992 film The Resurrected. She co-starred with Mary-Kate and Ashley Olsen in It Takes Two (1995), and the telefilm, Au Pair (1999).

In 1996, Sibbett was offered the role of Debra Barone on Everybody Loves Raymond. CBS executives felt that she was right for the role and Sibbett signed a deal for the show; however, she turned down the role upon learning that star Ray Romano and other key staff members were unaware that she had been cast in the part. The role went to Patricia Heaton, who had been the first choice of Romano and show creator Philip Rosenthal. 

Sibbett produced and starred in NY Film Festival Best Romantic Comedy indie award winner, A One Time Thing, produced medical infotainment pilot Doc in a Box (2009), a reality pilot Edge of Reality (2009) with medium David Edge, co-produced four documentaries on Braco, a Croatian faith healer, with her company, Wild Aloha Studios, in 2010, 2011 and 2012. The latest, Evolution, was released on August 30, 2013.

With hopes to resurrect a theater that had gone dark due to financial straits as well as help women everywhere suffering from intimate violence, Sibbett began directing theater in Hawaii, and with two sold out years of One Billion Rising and Eve Ensler's play The Vagina Monologues at The Kahilu Theatre on Hawaii Island the theater was saved and all raised funds for the play were donated to resources for women's health and safety.  Sibbett's new play, SHE'ISLAND, co-written by the women of Hawaii Island staged April 2016, also at the Kahilu Theatre. Sibbett served on the Board of Directors for the 490-seat Kahilu Theatre helping launch a major renovation campaign with her Board colleagues and generous donors to the life-changing arts.

Mother's Day weekend 2015 Sibbett was impacted by a miraculous event that set Jane on a new trajectory called Jane's Dancing Hands. While producing a live event, she spontaneously experienced what some called a kundalini awakening and when she regained full consciousness, she found the she and her "Dancing Hands," were suddenly a conduit for Source Energy and were helping people connect to Creator's creative energy and could be healed in mind, body, spirituality, and emotions. Jane, still, nearly eight years later, travels the world live and online to meet with individuals and groups to help them find health, peace, and balance. For more information, please go to janesibbett.com 

Since returning to the mainland, Sibbett has co-starred in the movies Jessica Darling's It List (2016), Winter Wedding (2017), A Date By Christmas Eve (2019), the pilot Manopause (2020) and the 27th Annual Critics' Choice 2022 nominee List of a Lifetime (2021) directed by indie director Roxy Shih.

In 2019, she won the Michael D Publishers Award, a non-fiction writing scholarship to the Story Summit Writer's School, to complete the manuscript of her memoirs, About Jane. As part of the scholarship, she also joined the Story Summit's group of faculty, supporting other burgeoning writers.

Philanthropy
Sibbett has long been an advocate for survivors of domestic violence, working with the nine shelters of 1736 Family Crisis Center in Los Angeles.

In March 2022, Sibbett assumed Chairperson of The Storyteller Foundation, a 501(c)3 non-profit, dedicated to supporting, elevating, and amplifying diverse stories and the writers who tell them all around the world with Story Summit and The Story Summit Writers School. In December 2022 Sibbett stepped down from her duties as Chairperson of the Storyteller Foundation, with the Board of Directors following suit in January and February 2023.

Personal life
In 1989, Sibbett began dating Jon Cryer after working with him for some time on The Famous Teddy Z. 

In 1992, Sibbett married Karl Fink, a TV writer and producer who worked on the first two seasons of Herman's Head. Fink and Sibbett divorced in January 2016. They have three children, Ruby, Kai, and Violet.

Filmography

Film

Television

References

External links
 
 
 

Actresses from California
American film actresses
American soap opera actresses
American television actresses
American voice actresses
Living people
Actresses from Berkeley, California
People from Alameda, California
21st-century American women
1962 births